Zhenyuan railway station is a railway station located in Zhenyuan County, Guizhou, China, on the Shanghai–Kunming railway line, which are operated by China Railway Chengdu Group.

History
The railway station opened in 1974.

Gallery

References

Buildings and structures in Zhenyuan County, Guizhou
Railway stations in Guizhou
Stations on the Shanghai–Kunming Railway
Railway stations in China opened in 1974